Perlovska river is a small river in the Sofia Valley in western Bulgaria. It takes its source from the foothills of Vitosha, runs through Sofia's South Park, separates the two lanes of Evlogi Georgiev Boulevard, runs through the neighbourhood Poduyane, and finally flows into the Iskar River.
The well-known Orlov Most is built over this river.

Geographical characteristics 
Perlovska springs from the villa zone of Dragalevtsi, crosses the Ring Road, connects the new neighborhoods, parallel to Bulgaria Boulevard, and then crosses the South Park. Under the Bulgaria Boulevard, the Boyana River flows into it and both go out into the open at Evlogi and Hristo Georgievi Blvd. From there Perlovska becomes a canal. In the city the course of the river is completely corrected, in places underground. It flows to the left into the Iskar River at 513 m above sea level, 1.2 km northeast of the Obradov Monastery.

Other interpretations of the name "Pearl River" are also widespread. For example, on a map made in GIS Sofia, the Perlovska River includes the Boyana River as its initial part, but does not include the river flowing through the South Park (the map does not indicate the name of the river in question, but in many other sources it is called Drenovichka).

The Perlovska River is one of the few small and short rivers that pass through Sofia. It crosses the city along the capital's Evlogi Georgiev Boulevard. A famous landmark of the Perlovska River is the Eagle Bridge, where Tsarigradsko Shosse begins. The river is also the northern border of Lozenets. The Perlovska River also crosses one of the largest parks in Sofia - the South Park. In the colloquial language of the people of Sofia, the river is also known as the "canal", which is reflected in derivative names such as the Small City Theater "Behind the canal".

Hydrological data 
The catchment area of the river is 257 km², which represents 3.0% of the catchment area of the Iskar River. The largest tributary is the Vladayska River (left).

The maximum outflow is in the months of April-June, due to the snowmelt in Vitosha, and the minimum - August-October.

Formally, the river is the fourth largest (high water) tributary of the Iskar River (after Malki Iskar, Lesnovska and Iskretska rivers), into which it flows after receiving the waters of the Boyanska, Slatinska and Vladayska rivers.

Gallery

References 

Rivers of Bulgaria
Geography of Sofia
Landforms of Sofia City Province